Delhi Daredevils (DD) is a franchise cricket team based in Delhi, India, which plays in the Indian Premier League (IPL). They were one of the eight teams that competed in the 2010 Indian Premier League. They were captained by Virender Sehwag. Delhi Daredevils finished 5th in the IPL and did not qualify for the Champions League T20.

Indian Premier League

Standings
Delhi Daredevils finished fifth in the league stage of IPL 2010.

Match log

Statistics

References

2010 Indian Premier League
Delhi Capitals seasons